Robert Matthew West (born June 25, 1956) is an American voice actor and graphic designer. He is best known as the original voice of Barney in the PBS children's television series Barney & Friends.

Career

1979–1988: Early voice work career
After graduating from college with a degree, West began his voice acting career in 1979.

In 1987, he was cast as the voices of Jasper T. Jowls and Pasqually in the Chuck E. Cheese's animatronic stage show, he voiced the characters for ten years until 1998.

1988–2000: Barney the Dinosaur
West became the voice of Barney in 1988, his first voice work as Barney was for the direct-to-video pilot series Barney and the Backyard Gang. He went on and continued voicing Barney in the television series Barney & Friends and would reprise the role again in a 70 market radio show, on Multi-Platinum and Multi-Gold albums, Barney's Great Adventure (1998), for CBS and NBC primetime specials, for touring performances, as a Daytime Emmy presenter, for toys, for educational games, and for "personal appearances". He also voiced interviews on The Today Show, LIVE! with Regis & Kathie Lee, Oprah, The Phil Donahue Show, John & Leeza From Hollywood, Marilu, and appearances around the world.

2000–2022: Retirement and reunion with Barney
From 1996 through 2002, he retired from voicing Barney, citing that he wanted "new challenges" with his life. He was temporarily replaced from Barney by four voice actor replacements David Franks, Duncan Brannan, who met him through their affiliation, Tim Dever and Dean Wendt with Carey Stinson replaced David Joyner as the character's body performer. However, West's pre-recorded voice could still be heard in A Day in the Park with Barney at Universal Studios Florida until the attraction's closure in February 2021, as it was recorded in the mid 1990s due to his retirement. Some other archival recordings of his voice are still heard in some of HIT Entertainment's The Little Big Club live stage shows until October 12, 2022.

West appeared in the Peacock documentary sequel series I Love You, You Hate Me.

2022–present: Graphic designing and later career
West also provided voices for TV and radio ads for Pepsi, Bud Light (English and Spanish), Coors Light, Frito-Lay, KFC, Armour Meats, Circuit City, Texas Monthly Magazine, and Texas Lottery.

West has also worked as a creative director, writer, producer and director in various radio and television commercials.

West now works as a graphic designer for film and television.

Filmography

Film

Television

Video games

Other work

Commercials and ads 
Pepsi – Narrator
Bud Light – Various voices (English and Spanish)
Coors Light
Frito-Lay – Narrator
KFC – Narrator
Armour Meats
Circuit City
Texas Monthly Magazine
Texas Lottery – Narrator

Production credits

Note

References

External links 
 Official website
 Bob West website on Archive.org
 

1956 births
Living people
American male voice actors
American male singers
Male actors from Pennsylvania
People from Washington County, Pennsylvania
Trinity University (Texas) alumni
20th-century American male actors
21st-century American male actors